Landenbeckerbruch is a locality in the municipality Schmallenberg in the district Hochsauerlandkreis in North Rhine-Westphalia, Germany.

The hamlet has 3 inhabitants and lies in the west of the municipality of Schmallenberg at a height of around 430 m. Landenbeckerbruch borders on the villages of Keppel, Arpe, Niederberndorf and Niederlandenbeck.

References

Villages in North Rhine-Westphalia
Schmallenberg